Chenxiang Pavilion or Chenxiangge Nunnery is a Buddhist temple located in the Huangpu District of Shanghai. It is currently serving as a nunnery for Buddhist nuns.

History

The temple was first established by an official named Pan Yunduan in 1600, under the rule of Wanli Emperor in the late Ming dynasty (1368–1644), the current temple was founded in 1815 during the Qing dynasty (1644–1911) and initially called "Ciyun Chan Temple".

On May 26, 1959, Chenxiang Pavilion was inscribed to the Shanghai Municipal Cultural Preservation Unit List by the Shanghai Municipal Government.

In 1966, Mao Zedong launched the ten years Cultural Revolution, the red guards attacked the temple and Chenxiang Pavilion was dilapidated with huge losses of the religious and cultural relics, including a Ming dynasty exquisite wooden statue of Guanyin. Then The temple was used as a factory.

Chenxiang Pavilion has been designated as a National Key Buddhist Temple in Han Chinese Area by State Council of China in 1983.

On November 20, 1996, it was listed among the fourth batch of "Major National Historical and Cultural Sites in Shanghai" by the State Council of China.

Architecture

The extant structure is based on the Qing dynasty (1644–1911) building principles and retains the traditional architectural style. Main structures from the Shanmen to the Hall of Guanyin are aligned with the central axis and divided into three countyards. At the very front is Paifang, followed by the Four Heavenly Kings Hall, Mahavira Hall, and finally Hall of Guanyin in the rear. On both sides of the central axis are Hall of Dharma Protectors and Memorial Hall of Master Yingci.

Hall of Four Heavenly Kings
Maitreya is enshrined in the Hall of Four Heavenly Kings and at the back of his statue is a statue of Skanda. Statues of Four Heavenly Kings are enshrined in the left and right side of the hall.

Mahavira Hall
The Mahavira Hall enshrining the Three Saints of Hua-yan. In the middle is Sakyamuni, statues of Manjushri and Samantabhadra stand on the left and right sides of Sakyamuni's statue. Statues of Brahma and Indra are placed on both sides of statues of Manjushri and Samantabhadra. At the back of the hall enshrines the statue of Guanyin with Shancai standing on the left and Longnü on the right. The statues of Eighteen Arhats sitting on the seats before both sides of the gable walls.

Hall of Guanyin
The original statue was carved in 1600 during the Ming dynasty (1368–1644) but was completely destroyed during the ten-year devastating cultural revolution. The present version was presented by Hong Kong Buddhist devotees.

Hall of Dharma Protectors
The Hall of Dharma Protectors, for the worship of Lord Guan, a famous general during the Three Kingdoms era and honoured as the protector of Sangharama.

References

Buddhist temples in Shanghai
Buildings and structures in Shanghai
Tourist attractions in Shanghai
19th-century establishments in China
19th-century Buddhist temples
Religious buildings and structures completed in 1815